(The) Afterlight may refer to: 
 UFO: Afterlight, a 2007 video game
 Afterlight (album), a 2009 album by Steve Roach
 Thea Gilmore, also known as Afterlight, English singer-songwriter
 The Afterlight (2009 film), an American drama film
 The Afterlight (2021 film), an experimental art film
 After Light, a 2012 song by Rustie